The El Salvador Under 17's football team, is controlled by Federación Salvadoreña de Fútbol and represents El Salvador in international under-17 or youth football competitions.

Tournament Records

FIFA U-17 World Cup

UNCAF preliminary round

CONCACAF U-17 tournament

From 1983 until 1991, competition was U-16, not U-17.

Fixtures and results
The following is a list of match results in the last 12 months, as well as any future matches that have been scheduled.

Key
 F   = Friendly
 UF  = Unofficial Friendly
 U-17 Q = 2015 U-17 Championship qualifying
 PSO = Penalty shootout
 a.e.t. = After extra time
El Salvador's scores listed first

Players

Current squad
The following 20 players were called up for the 2023 CONCACAF U-17 Championship in February.

Recent call-ups
The following players have been called up to the El Salvador U-17 squad in the past 12 months.

Personnel

Current staff

List of coaches
  Jorge Araujo (1990)
  Cesar Acevedo (1999)
  Armando Contreras Palma (2001)
  Remberto Santillana (2002)
  Hector Cocherari (2004)
  Norberto Huezo (February 2006 –)
  Mario Rodriguez (Jan 2008)
  Victor Manuel Pacheco (November 2010 – December 2011)
  Jose Luis Rugamas (January 2012 – January 2013)
  Victor Manuel Pacheco (February 2013 – October 2013)
  Rafael Tobar (August 2014 – February 2015)
  Edgar Henríquez (May 2015 – December 2015)
  Erick Dowson Prado (January 2016 – April 2017)
  Diego Pizarro (September 2017 – December 2017)
  José de la Cruz (January 2017 - December 2017)
  Ernesto Gochez (Dec 2018- 2021)
  Juan Carlos Serrano (July 2022 - Present)

Record versus other nations
Records for competitive matches only.
As of 03-01-13

See also
El Salvador national football team
El Salvador national under-20 football team
El Salvador national under-21 football team
El Salvador national under-23 football team
Federación Salvadoreña de Fútbol

References

External links
Federación Salvadoreña de Fútbol Official Site (Spanish)
El Salvador national football team (Non-Official Site) (Spanish)
soccerway

under-17
Central American national under-17 association football teams